The Philadelphia Phillies Radio Network is a network of 21 radio stations in Pennsylvania, Delaware, and New Jersey that air Major League Baseball games of the Philadelphia Phillies. The lead announcers are Scott Franzke with play-by-play and Larry Andersen with color commentary. The flagship station is WIP-FM 94.1 in Philadelphia. The broadcasts were discontinued on the former AM flagship station WPHT 1210 in 2016 (both stations share the same ownership and the move from WPHT was done to reduce pre-emptions of its talk radio schedule).  

WTTM in Lindenwold, New Jersey and WWAC in Atlantic City, New Jersey also air a separate broadcast in Spanish. Oscar Budejen is the play by play announcer, while Bill Kulik provides color commentary.

Affiliates

Key

Stations

Current Producers
 Mike Angelina
 Tucker Bagley
 Nick Earnshaw
 Jack Fritz
 Francisco Rojas
 Dan "Buzz" Wilson

See also
List of current MLB announcers
Broadcasting of sports events
List of Sirius Satellite Radio stations
List of XM Satellite Radio channels

References

Philadelphia Phillies
Major League Baseball on the radio
Sports radio networks in the United States